The 1985 Metro Conference men's basketball tournament was held March 7–9 at Freedom Hall in Louisville, Kentucky. 

Memphis State defeated  in the championship game, 90–86 in OT, to win their third Metro men's basketball tournament.

The Tigers received the conference's automatic bid to the 1985 NCAA Tournament, and would go on to reach the 1985 Final Four. Additionally, Virginia Tech received an at-large bid.

Format
All eight members of the conference participated. Teams were seeded based on regular season conference records.

Bracket

References

Metro Conference men's basketball tournament
Tournament
Metro Conference men's basketball tournament
Metro Conference men's basketball tournament